Five Live is a live EP by alternative rock band Toad the Wet Sprocket.  The EP was a limited pressing of 5,000 copies bundled with the first pressing of the album fear. Recorded live on December 19, 1991, at the Whisky a Go Go, Hollywood, CA, and on December 21, 1991, at the Anaconda Theater, Santa Barbara, CA. Mixed at Master Control, Burbank, CA. It contains 4 live songs from their prior albums as well as a live version of "Hold Her Down" which is from the "Fear" album.

Track listing
 "Jam" – 3:08
 "One Little Girl" – 3:19
 "Scenes from a Vinyl Recliner" – 4:31
 "Come Back Down" – 2:50
 "Hold Her Down" – 2:53

References

1992 EPs
Toad the Wet Sprocket live albums
Live EPs
1992 live albums
Albums recorded at the Whisky a Go Go
Columbia Records live albums
Columbia Records EPs